Peter Štepanovský (born 12 January 1988) is a Slovak football midfielder who plays for KFC Komárno.

Club career
Štepanovský was born in Skalica. Peter started his career in the youth system of MFK Skalica and later went to Slovak giants Slovan Bratislava. His equalizing goal against Roma meant procedure in the group stage UEFA Europa League in 2011/2012 season. In February 2012 Štepanovský signed a contract with FK Senica, playing in the Slovak Corgoň Liga.

External links
FK Senica profile 
ŠK Slovan Bratislava profile

References

1988 births
Living people
Sportspeople from Skalica
Slovak footballers
Association football midfielders
ŠK Slovan Bratislava players
FK Senica players
FC Spartak Trnava players
FC Zbrojovka Brno players
FC Urartu players
FC DAC 1904 Dunajská Streda players
Slovak Super Liga players
Armenian Premier League players
Expatriate footballers in Armenia
MFK Karviná players
KFC Komárno players
Czech National Football League players
Expatriate footballers in the Czech Republic
Slovak expatriate sportspeople in the Czech Republic
Slovakia under-21 international footballers